This is a list of shopping malls in Venezuela.

Capital District 

 Centro Sambil
 Centro San Ignacio
 C.C. Prado de María

Falcon
 Sambil Paraguaná

Mérida 
 C.C. Artema

Trujillo 

 Almacenes Maldonado

References 

Venezuela
Shopping malls